Signal to Noise is an urban fantasy novel by Canadian-Mexican author Silvia Moreno-Garcia. The novel was published by Solaris Books in February 2015. Moreno-Garcia stated that she was inspired to write the novel based on her parents, who both worked at a radio station.

Plot
In 2009, Mercedes "Meche" Vega returns to Mexico City to attend the funeral of her DJ father. While there she reminisces about her life in the city in 1988 when she was fifteen and how she accidentally discovered, along with her best friends Sebastian and Daniela, that she could perform spells by listening to songs.

Reception
The novel received generally positive reviews upon publication. In April 2015 it was named one of the Best Science Fiction Novels of the Month in The Guardian.

It was a finalist for the 2017 Aurora Award for Best Novel.

References

2015 science fiction novels
Novels set in Mexico City
Canadian science fiction novels
Novels about magic
Novels set in the 1980s
2015 debut novels
2015 Canadian novels
Solaris Books books